Ochthera lauta is a species of shore flies in the family Ephydridae.

Distribution
United States, West Indies and Central America.

References

Ephydridae
Insects described in 1896
Diptera of North America